Lynn-Avon United is a semi-professional association Football club based in New Lynn, Auckland, New Zealand. Their first team plays in the Lotto Sport Italia NRFL Division 1.

History
The club was formed in 1996 through an amalgamation of Lynndale (originally Lyndale) AFC and Avondale United. These two teams had a common origin, Lynndale having split from Avondale FC in 1947. Avondale later changed their name to Red Shield and then Avondale United.

Present day
Former player for Wycombe Wanderers and the New Zealand Knights player Sean Devine, who lead Exeter City to a 0–0 with Manchester United at Old Trafford in a 2005 English FA Cup tie, captains the Lotto Sport Italia NRFL Division 1B side.

References

External links
 Official website
 The Ultimate New Zealand Soccer Website
 Auckland Football Federation Lynn-Avon page

Association football clubs in Auckland
1996 establishments in New Zealand
Sport in West Auckland, New Zealand